The 2019 Vivo Pro Kabaddi League was the seventh season of Pro Kabaddi League. The season began on 20 July 2019 and concluded on 19 October 2019. The zonal system present in the previous seasons was removed, and each team played against all the other teams twice.

Bengal Warriors defeated Dabang Delhi in the final match to win their maiden title   Vivo Pro Kabaddi League 2019 (PKL 7)

Teams

Stadiums and locations

Personnel and sponsorship

Foreign players
Each team can sign maximum 3 foreign players in the squad.

Sponsorship
Title Sponsor

 Vivo

Associate Sponsors
 Tata Motors
 Dream11
 Honda

Partners
 UltraTech Cement

Broadcast Sponsor
 Star Sports

Viewership
Unlike the last season that witnessed a 31 percent dip in viewership data to 1.1 billion impressions from the 1.6 billion impressions of season five, PKL 7 has registered a growth of 9 percent in viewership numbers and has garnered 1.2 billion impressions, as per BARC India.

Points table

Best raiders

Best defenders

League stage

Leg 1 – Gachibowli Indoor Stadium, Hyderabad

Leg 2 – Dome@NSCI SVP Stadium, Mumbai

Leg 3 – Patliputra Sports Complex, Patna

Leg 4 – The Arena, Ahmedabad

Leg 5 – Jawaharlal Nehru Indoor Stadium, Chennai

Leg 6 – Thyagaraj Sports Complex, New Delhi

Leg 7 – Kanteerava Indoor Stadium, Bangalore

Leg 8 – Netaji Subhas Chandra Bose Indoor Stadium, Kolkata

Leg 9 – Shree Shiv Chhatrapati Sports Complex, Pune

Leg 10 – Sawai Mansingh Indoor Stadium, Jaipur

Leg 11 –  Tau Devilal Sports Complex, Panchkula

Leg 12 – Shaheed Vijay Singh Pathik Sports Complex, Greater Noida

Playoffs

Bracket

Eliminator 1

Eliminator 2

Semi Final 1

Semi Final 2

Final

References

Pro Kabaddi League seasons
Pro Kabaddi League